Corriere del Lunedì ("Monday Courrier") was an Italian-language weekly newspaper published in Tripoli, Libya, founded in 1950. The newspaper was published by the Political Association for the Progress of Libya, a pro-independence front organization of the clandestine Communist Party. The newspaper was suppressed prior to Libyan independence in December 1951.

See also
 Libyan Communist Party

References

1950 establishments in Libya
1951 disestablishments in Libya
Defunct newspapers published in Libya
Communism in Libya
Communist newspapers
Italian-language newspapers
Newspapers published in Libya
Mass media in Tripoli, Libya
Publications established in 1950
Publications disestablished in 1951